Delsaux Farm Cemetery is a cemetery located in the French municipality of Beugny (Pas-de-Calais). The military graves are maintained by the Commonwealth War Graves Commission.

The cemetery contains 495 burials and commemorations of the First World War. 61 of the burials are unidentified and 32 others, identified as a whole but not individually, are marked with headstones inscribed "Buried near this spot".

References

External links
 

Commonwealth War Graves Commission cemeteries in France
World War I cemeteries in France
Cemeteries in Pas-de-Calais
Works of Edwin Lutyens in France